Below is an incomplete list of Israeli museums, some of which are located in East Jerusalem.

References

External links
 Israel's official national museum portal 

Museums
Israel
Museums
Museums
Israel